The men's 5000 metres competition at the 2018 Asian Games took place on 30 August 2018 at the Gelora Bung Karno Stadium.

Schedule
All times are Western Indonesia Time (UTC+07:00)

Records

Results
Legend
DNS — Did not start

References

Men's 5000 metres
2018